Helen Woodhouse (born 6 May 1953) is a British sprint canoer who competed in the early 1970s. She was eliminated in the semifinals of the K-2 500 m event at the 1972 Summer Olympics in Munich.

References

EDUCATION
she was educated at St. Michael's Catholic Grammar School in North Finchley, London.

1953 births
Canoeists at the 1972 Summer Olympics
Living people
Olympic canoeists of Great Britain
British female canoeists